The 2005–06 Midland Football Combination season was the 69th in the history of Midland Football Combination, a football competition in England.

Premier Division

The Premier Division featured 19 clubs which competed in the division last season, along with three new clubs:
Atherstone Town, promoted from Division One
Bridgnorth Town, relegated from the Midland Football Alliance
Cadbury Athletic, promoted from Division One

Also, Coventry Marconi changed name to Coventry Copsewood and Castle Vale KH changed name to Castle Vale.

League table

References

2005–06
10